Selectivity may refer to:

Psychology and behaviour
 Choice, making a selection among options
 Discrimination, the ability to recognize differences
 Socioemotional selectivity theory, in social psychology

Engineering
 Selectivity (radio), a measure of the performance of a radio receiver to respond only to the radio signal it is tuned
 Selectivity (circuit breakers), the coordination of overcurrent protection devices in an electrical installation

Biology
 Binding selectivity, in pharmacology
 Functional selectivity, in pharmacology
 Natural selection, in biology

Chemistry
 Reactivity–selectivity principle, in general chemistry
 Chemoselectivity, a term used in organic chemistry to describe reactivity of one functional group in the presence of other groups
 Stereoselectivity, a term used in organic chemistry to describe the distribution of isomers in reaction products
 Regioselectivity, a term used in organic chemistry to describe reaction mechanisms and predict reaction products

Mathematics
 Sensitivity and specificity, in statistical theory

See also
 Select (disambiguation)
 Selection (disambiguation)